Maimonides may refer to:

 Abraham Maimonides (1186-1237), son of Moses Maimonides
 Moses Maimonides (1135-1204), a Jewish philosopher
 Maimonides School, a Jewish day school in Brookline, Massachusetts
 Maimonides Synagogue, a historic synagogue in Cairo, Egypt
 Maimonides Medical Center, in Brooklyn, New York
 Maimonides Foundation, former name of the Khalili Foundation, an interfaith foundation in London, England
 Maimonides Park, a minor league baseball stadium in Coney Island, Brooklyn, New York City
 

Greek-language surnames
Jewish surnames
Disambiguation